Bánh Mì Verlag is an experimental music record label based in Queens, New York City, USA.

Artists

References

External links
 Official Site
 Discogs Page

Record labels established in 2013
Electronic music record labels